Jemima Marcelle Goldsmith (born 30 January 1974; known as Jemima Khan for work) is an English screenwriter, television, film and documentary producer and the founder of Instinct Productions, a television production company. She was formerly a journalist and associate editor of The New Statesman, a British political and cultural magazine, and served as the European editor-at-large for the American magazine Vanity Fair.

Early life and education
Born at Chelsea and Westminster Hospital in London, Goldsmith is the eldest child of Lady Annabel Vane-Tempest-Stewart and financier Sir James Goldsmith (1933–1997). Her mother, from an aristocratic Anglo−Irish family, is the daughter of the 8th Marquess of Londonderry. Goldsmith's father was the son of a luxury hotel tycoon and former Conservative Member of Parliament (MP), Major Frank Goldsmith, who was a member of the Goldsmith family of German−Jewish descent. Her paternal grandmother was French.

Goldsmith's parents were married to different partners at the time of her birth, but they married each other in 1978 in order to legitimize their children. She has two younger brothers, Zac Goldsmith and Ben Goldsmith, and five paternal and three maternal half-siblings, including Robin Birley and India Jane Birley.

Goldsmith grew up at Ormeley Lodge and attended the Old Vicarage preparatory school, then Francis Holland Girls School. From age 10 to 17, she was an equestrian in London. In 1993, Goldsmith enrolled at the University of Bristol and studied English, but she dropped out when she married Imran Khan in 1995. She eventually completed her bachelor's degree in March 2002 with upper second-class honours. She later studied at the School of Oriental and African Studies and was awarded a master of arts degree in Middle Eastern Studies, focusing on Modern Trends in Islam, from the University of London in 2003.

Film, television and theatre
In 2015, Jemima Khan founded Instinct Productions, a London-based content company specializing in television, documentaries and film with former Princess Productions managing director, Henrietta Conrad.

Through Instinct Productions, Khan was the executive producer for the Emmy-nominated six-part documentary series The Clinton Affair, alongside Alex Gibney and Emmy-winning director Blair Foster, for the A&E Network.

She was the executive producer of Emmy-nominated The Case Against Adnan Syed, a TV documentary series for Sky Atlantic and HBO about the Adnan Syed case, which inspired the popular 'Serial' podcast which Academy Award nominee Amy Berg ("Deliver Us from Evil") directed.

She was a producer on the Golden Globes and Emmy nominated Impeachment, Ryan Patrick Murphy's FX American Crime Story Season Three, a 10 part drama series about the Clinton–Lewinsky scandal.

Khan wrote and produced What's Love Got to Do with It?, a cross-cultural romantic comedy for Working Title Films and Studio Canal, starring Lily James and Emma Thompson which premiered at the 2022 Toronto Film Festival and won Best Comedy at the 2022 Rome Film Festival and is released in February 2023.

Previously, she was the executive producer for the BAFTA nominated documentary film We Steal Secrets: The Story of WikiLeaks by Alex Gibney, released in 2013. She was also the co-executive producer for the documentary films Unmanned: America's Drone Wars (released in 2013) and Making A Killing: Guns, Greed and the NRA (released in 2016), both directed by Robert Greenwald.She co-produced the play Drones, Baby, Drones at the Arcola Theatre, directed by Nicolas Kent and Mehmet Ergen, that premiered in November 2016.

Khan is also the executive producer of a TV drama series about the Rothschild banking dynasty written by Julian Fellowes.

She was also a contributor to the fifth season of the historical drama series The Crown, which would depict the final years of Diana, Princess of Wales; however, she asked for her contributions to be removed as she felt the "storyline would not necessarily be told as respectfully or compassionately" as she had hoped.

Journalism career
Although Goldsmith had written articles when she lived in Pakistan, she started contributing op-eds to the United Kingdom's newspapers and magazines including The Independent, The Sunday Times, The Evening Standard and The Observer. In 2008, she was granted an exclusive interview with Pakistani President Pervez Musharraf on the eve of the elections for The Independent. She was a Sunday Telegraph columnist from 21 October 2007 to 27 January 2008.

She was a feature writer and a contributing editor for British Vogue from 2008 to 2011. In 2011, she was appointed Vanity Fair'''s new European editor-at-large. She was also associate editor at The Independent.

In April 2011, she guest-edited the New Statesman and themed the issue around freedom of speech. She interviewed the deputy prime minister Nick Clegg and included contributions from Russell Brand, Tim Robbins, Simon Pegg, Oliver Stone, Tony Benn, and Julian Assange, with cover art by Anish Kapoor and Damien Hirst. According to Nick Cohen in The Observer, "Jemima Khan was by a country mile the best editor of the New Statesman that the journal has had since the mid-1970s". The magazine issue included "an unexpected scoop" from Hugh Grant who went undercover to hack Paul McMullan, a former News of the World journalist, who had been involved in hacking as a reporter. In November 2011, she joined as an associate editor of the New Statesman.

Fashion
In 1998, Goldsmith launched an eponymous fashion label that employed poor Pakistani women to embroider western clothes with eastern handiwork to be sold in London and New York. Profits were donated to her then husband's Shaukat Khanum Memorial Cancer Hospital. She ran the organisation until December 2001, when she shut down the business due to the economic situation following the September 11 attacks, and so she could focus on fundraising and on supporting her husband in Pakistani politics.

In 2008, she modelled the relaunched Azzaro Couture fragrance and was a guest co-designer of a Spring 2009 collection for Azzaro, with her fee reportedly donated to UNICEF.

As voted by Daily Telegraph readers, she won the Rover People's Award for the best dressed female celebrity at the 2001 British Fashion Awards. She was also featured on Vanity Fair's Annual International Best-Dressed List in 2004, 2005 and 2007, the last of which she was inducted into their Best Dressed Hall of Fame.

Philanthropy
During her marriage, Goldsmith established the Jemima  Khan Afghan Refugee Appeal to provide tents, clothing, food, and healthcare for Afghan refugees at Jalozai camp in Peshawar.

She became an Ambassador for UNICEF UK in 2001, and made field trips to Kenya, Romania, Bangladesh, Afghanistan and Pakistan, the last of which she later helped victims of the 2005 Kashmir earthquake by raising emergency funds. She has promoted UNICEF's Breastfeeding Manifesto, Growing Up Alone and End Child Exploitation campaigns in the UK.

In 2003, she visited Palestinian refugee camps in Lebanon, Jordan, the West Bank and Gaza to promote the charity Hope and Optimism for Palestinians in the Next Generation (HOPING).

She also supports the Soil Association and the HOPING foundation for Palestinian refugee children.

Politics and social action
In addition to her charitable work, Goldsmith campaigns for various social and political causes. She has campaigned against the wars in Iraq and Afghanistan as well as for freedom of information; she attended Assange's extradition hearings and gave a speech at the Stop the War Coalition's rally in defence of Wikileaks alongside Tony Benn and Tariq Ali. Along with John Pilger and Ken Loach, she was part of the six-member group in Westminster Magistrates Court willing to post bail for Julian Assange when he was arrested in London on 7 December 2010. However, she later changed her mind about Assange, questioning his unwillingness to answer the sexual misconduct allegations which led to his arrest and what she described as his demand for "cultish devotion" from his supporters.

In 2014, she publicly backed the Hacked Off campaign group which advocates reform of British press regulation. In August 2014, she was one of 200 public figures who were signatories to a letter to The Guardian opposing Scottish independence in the run-up to September's referendum on that issue.

On 3 November 2018, Goldsmith criticised the fact that the Government of Pakistan was considering putting the Christian woman, Asia Bibi, on the exit control list despite the fact that she was acquitted by the Supreme Court, in order to compromise with the Islamist political party Tehreek-e-Labbaik Pakistan.

Personal life
In 1995, Goldsmith married Imran Khan, a retired cricketer (who would later go on to serve as the 22nd Prime Minister of Pakistan from 2018 to 2022), with whom she had two sons. The couple divorced in 2004.

Goldsmith was a close friend of Diana, Princess of Wales, who visited her in Lahore in 1996. On 29 December 2000, Goldsmith and her family were on a British Airways jet to Kenya which was temporarily knocked off course and dived thousands of feet after a mentally ill passenger tried to seize controls in the cockpit. Her mother later said, "Jemima was frightened of flying even before the incident; she's petrified [now]".

In 2002, she was listed at number 18 with £20 million on the Evening Standard's young millionaires list.

Following her divorce in 2004, she returned to London and later became involved in a romantic relationship with Hugh Grant. A 2005 article in the Evening Standard noted that "Jemima's profile" changed from "high during her first marriage" to "soaring since she became involved with Hugh Grant". Her relationship was scrutinised extensively by the tabloids, but a 2005 survey of London visitors favoured them as "the celebrity couple people would most like to show them round London". In February 2007, Grant announced that the couple had "decided to split amicably". Grant's spokesman added that he "has nothing but positive things to say about Jemima."

In September 2013, The Daily Telegraph reported that she was dating British activist and actor Russell Brand. In September 2014, she and Brand separated.Eizabeth Beynon "No Khan do: Jemima and Russell Brand ‘split after a year’", The Sunday Times, 21 September 2014

Marriage to Imran Khan
On 16 May 1995, Goldsmith and Imran Khan  were married in a Nikah ceremony in Paris. They also had a civil ceremony on 21 June 1995 at the Richmond Register Office, followed by a midsummer ball at Ormeley Lodge. A few months before her wedding, she converted to Islam, citing the writings of Muhammad Asad, Charles le Gai Eaton and Alija Izetbegović as her influences. After her marriage to Khan, she relocated to his hometown, Lahore, Pakistan, where she learned to speak Urdu and also wore traditional Pakistani clothes.

She wrote in a 2008 article for The Times'' that she "over-conformed in [her] eagerness to be accepted" into the "new and radically different culture" of Pakistan. Goldsmith stated that prior to her conversion to Islam she was technically Anglican but "was made familiar with Jewish traditions", since her paternal grandfather Frank Goldsmith was German Jewish. During her marriage, her Jewish heritage was used by Khan's political opponents to question their credibility in Pakistani politics, especially concerning accusations that they supported the Jewish lobby.

Goldsmith has two sons from her marriage to Khan: Sulaiman Isa (born 1996) and Kasim (born 1999).

In 1999, she was charged in Pakistan with illegally exporting Islamic era antique tiles. She said that the charge was a fabrication to harass and damage her husband, but nevertheless left Pakistan to stay with her mother for fear of incarceration. After General Pervez Musharraf overthrew elected Prime Minister Nawaz Sharif in a coup d'état in 1999, the Ministry of Culture and Archaeology verified the tiles were not antiques, and the court dropped the charges, allowing her to return to Lahore.

Goldsmith supported her husband as he became more involved in his Pakistan Tehreek-e-Insaf party.

On 22 June 2004, it was announced that the couple had divorced ending the nine-year marriage because it was "difficult for Jemima to adapt to the political life of Imran Khan in Pakistan". The marriage ended amicably. Khan has said the six months leading to the divorce and the six months after were the hardest year of his life. After the divorce, Goldsmith returned to Britain with the former couple's two sons. According to the divorce settlement, Khan's boys visit him in Pakistan during their school holidays, and when he comes to London to see them he stays with his former mother-in-law, Lady Annabel Goldsmith. According to Jemima Goldsmith, she and Khan remain on good terms. While she was married, she was described as being shy, but also modest, stylish and levelheaded.

Goldsmith retained "Khan" as her family name until December 2014, when Imran Khan married news anchor Reham Khan, but she has continued to be credited as Jemima Khan on work projects.

References

External links
 Instinct Productions
 
 UNICEF UK Ambassador Jemima Khan, official homepage at UNICEF.org.uk
 Journalisted
 IMDB

1974 births
Living people
Alumni of the University of London
Alumni of SOAS University of London
Alumni of the University of Bristol
British women journalists
British former Christians
British people of French descent
British people of German-Jewish descent
British people of Irish descent
British film producers
British women film producers
British television producers
British women television producers
British documentary film producers
British screenwriters
British women screenwriters
Film producers from London
British emigrants to Pakistan
Charity fundraisers (people)
Converts to Islam from Protestantism
Former Anglicans
Jemima
Jemima
Naturalised citizens of Pakistan
Pakistani film producers
Pakistani women film producers
Pakistani television producers
Pakistani screenwriters
Pakistani former Christians
Pakistani people of Anglo-Irish descent
Pakistani people of English-Jewish descent
Pakistani people of German-Jewish descent
Pakistani people of French descent
Pakistani women journalists
People educated at Francis Holland School
People from Chelsea, London
UNICEF Goodwill Ambassadors
Vanity Fair (magazine) people